The 2024 United States Senate election in Montana will be held on November 5, 2024, to elect a member of the United States Senate to represent the state of Montana. Incumbent three-term Democratic Senator Jon Tester is seeking re-election to a fourth term in office. He was last re-elected in 2018, with 50.3% of the vote. Tester is one of three Democratic senators up for re-election in states that Donald Trump won in both 2016 and 2020, alongside Senators Joe Manchin of West Virginia and Sherrod Brown of Ohio. Tester's re-election is considered essential for Democrats' chances to retain the Senate majority in 2024.

Democratic primary

Candidates

Declared
Jon Tester, incumbent U.S. Senator (2007–present)

Republican primary

Candidates

Publicly expressed interest
 Austin Knudsen, Attorney General of Montana (2021–present) and 53rd Speaker of the Montana House of Representatives (2015–2019)

Potential
 Tim Sheehy, founder and CEO of Bridger Aerospace

Declined

Endorsements

Polling

General election

Predictions

Polling

Jon Tester vs. Greg Gianforte

Jon Tester vs. Matt Rosendale

Jon Tester vs. Ryan Zinke

Notes

References

External links
Official campaign websites
Jon Tester (D) for Senate

2024
Montana
United States Senate